Hierochloe odorata or Anthoxanthum nitens (commonly known as sweet grass, manna grass, Mary’s grass or vanilla grass, and as holy grass in the UK, bison grass e.g. by Polish vodka producers) is an aromatic herb native to northern Eurasia and North America. It is considered sacred by many Indigenous peoples in Canada and the United States. It is used as a smudge, in herbal medicine and in the production of distilled beverages (e.g., Żubrówka, Wisent). It owes its distinctive sweet scent to the presence of coumarin.

This variety of grass is distinct from the species commonly known as buffalo grass in Australia and the United States (Stenotaphrum secundatum and Bouteloua dactyloides, respectively).

Characteristics
Hierochloe odorata is a very hardy perennial, able to grow to the Arctic Circle. The base of the leaf, just below the soil surface, is broad and white, without hairs; the underside of the leaf is shiny and glabrous. In the wild, the bases of the leaves are frequently purple-red colored, and this indicates a phosphorus-deficient soil.

There are several strains of sweetgrass — a regular strain that can be harvested once or twice a year, and a naturally occurring polyploid strain, which is much faster growing and can be harvested three to five times a year.

Two chemicals found in sweetgrass, phytol and coumarin, repel mosquitoes.

Taxonomy
The name Hierochloe odorata is from the Greek and Latin. Hierochloe means "holy grass" and odorata means "fragrant".  Some authors include Hierochloe in Anthoxanthum; in this case this species is given the epithet nitens to avoid confusion with a different species, Anthoxanthum odoratum, sweet vernal grass.

Propagation
Propagation is easiest by cutting out plugs from established plants.  Grown in sun or partial shade, they do not like drought.  Seeds are usually not viable, or if they are, take two to three years to develop a robust root system.

Distribution
In North America Hierochloe odorata occurs in southern Canada, northern Great Plains/Rocky Mountains and northwest of U.S., and New England. In continental Europe it occurs north from Switzerland. There is only one site in Ireland, and it is recorded in four counties of Scotland and one in north-eastern England.

Uses
The plant is harvested by cutting grass in early to late summer at the desired length. Hierochloe odorata harvested after the first frost has little or no scent and is less desirable for basketry.  Basketweavers sun-dry cut sweet grass until it is dry and brittle.  The brittle form of sweet grass must be soaked in warm water until it becomes pliable.  The pliable grass is typically braided into thick threads and then redried for use.

European traditions
Holy grass was strewn before church doors on saints' days in northern Europe, presumably because of the sweet smell that arose when it was trodden on.  It was used in France to flavor candy, tobacco, soft drinks, and perfumes. In Europe, the species Hierochloe alpina is frequently substituted or used interchangeably.  In Russia, it was used to flavor tea. It is still used in flavored vodka, the most notable example being Polish Żubrówka.

Indigenous traditions (North America)
Sweet grass is widely used by Indigenous peoples from many different Nations in North America. Among many of the Plains Indians it is considered one of the "four sacred medicines". Though being used for many purposes, its main two purposes for many tribes is to attract good spirits. As well as being used as a natural mosquito repellent. It is also known as the "Hair of Mother Earth". Robin Wall Kimmerer writes among other things about sweetgrass and its sustainable harvesting in her book Braiding Sweetgrass.

References

External links

Pooideae
Grasses of North America
Flora of Asia
Flora of Europe
Herbs
Native American religion
Indigenous culture in Canada
Plants used in traditional Native American medicine